Fo Guang Shan Temple Tawau is a Buddhist temple located in Tawau, Sabah, Malaysia. It is one of the overseas temple for the Fo Guang Shan Buddhist organization based in Taiwan.

References

External links 
 Pictures of Fo Guang Shan Temple, Tawau

Chinese-Malaysian culture
Buddhist temples in Malaysia
Tourist attractions in Sabah
Fo Guang Shan temples
21st-century Buddhist temples